Agnes of Aquitaine may refer to:
Agnes of Burgundy, Duchess of Aquitaine, (c. 995–1068), wife of William V, Duke of Aquitaine
Agnes of Poitou, (c. 1025–1077), wife of Henry III, Holy Roman Emperor
Agnes of Aquitaine, Queen of León and Castile, (died c. 1078), wife of Alfonso VI of Castile
Agnes of Aquitaine, Countess of Savoy, (died c. 1097), wife of Peter I of Savoy
Agnes of Aquitaine, Queen of Aragon and Navarre, (1072–1097), wife of King Peter I of Aragon and Navarre
Agnes of Aquitaine, wife of Ramiro II of Aragon, (c. 1105 – c. 1159) wife of Aimery V of Thours and Ramiro II of Aragon

See also
Agnes, wife of Ramiro I of Aragon, (fl. 1054–1062), perhaps of Aquitaine, perhaps identical to the Countess of Savoy